In differential geometry, an equivariant differential form on a manifold M acted upon by a Lie group G is a polynomial map

from the Lie algebra  to the space of differential forms on M that are equivariant; i.e.,

In other words, an equivariant differential form is an invariant element of

It is easy to see  (use the fact the Lie derivative of  along  is zero) and one then puts

which is called the equivariant cohomology of M (which coincides with the ordinary equivariant cohomology defined in terms of Borel construction.) The definition is due to H. Cartan. The notion has an application to the equivariant index theory.

-closed or -exact forms are called equivariantly closed or equivariantly exact.

The integral of an equivariantly closed form may be evaluated from its restriction to the fixed point by means of the localization formula.

References 

 

Differential geometry